Uzhara (Ujara) is a rural locality (a village) in Mayadykovsky Selsoviet, Birsky District, Bashkortostan, Russia. The population was 69 as of 2010. There is 1 street.

Geography 
Uzhara is located 29 km southwest of Birsk (the district's administrative centre) by road. Shelkanovo is the nearest rural locality.

References 

Rural localities in Birsky District